The Swazi Ambassador in Washington, D. C. is the official representative of the Government in Mbabane to the Government of the United States.

List of representatives

See also 

 Eswatini–United States relations

References

United States
Eswatini
Ambassadors